Valiabad (also Romanized as Valīābād) is a village in Jastun Shah Rural District, Hati District, Lali County, Khuzestan Province, Iran. At the 2006 census, its population was 67, in 10 families.

References 

Populated places in Lali County